Romolo Alzani (born 6 March 1921 in Rome; died 3 October 2002) was a professional Italian football player.

He was the part of the very reliable defensive formation of S.S. Lazio for several years that was called "iron defense" ("la difesa di ferro").

Overall, he played for 10 seasons in the Serie A for A.S. Roma and Lazio, collecting 247 appearances and 6 goals.

External links

1921 births
2002 deaths
Italian footballers
Serie A players
Serie C players
Rimini F.C. 1912 players
A.S. Roma players
S.S. Lazio players
S.S. Alba-Audace Roma players
A.S.D. Città di Foligno 1928 players
Association football midfielders